is a Japanese manga artist, best known for creating Pani Poni. Pani Poni was adapted into an anime television series and spun off into two manga series, Maro-Mayu and The Alternative Cure Magical Girl Behoimi-chan. However Hikawa ended the series in 2011 to work on other projects. Hikawa is currently working on his new manga series, Candy Pop Nightmare.

References

External links

Manga artists from Tokyo
1975 births
Living people